Leonel Morales (born 2 September 1988, Coripata, Bolivia) is a Bolivian football left-back who plays for Real Potosí.

International career
Morales made his debut for Bolivia in an October 2014 friendly match against Chile and has, as of June 2016, earned a total of 10 caps, scoring no goals. He represented his country in 2 FIFA World Cup qualification matches and at the 2015 Copa América.

Honours
 Moldovan National Division: 2011–12
 Bolivian Primera División: 2008 Apertura

References

External links

1988 births
Living people
People from Nor Yungas Province
Association football fullbacks
Bolivian footballers
Bolivia international footballers
2015 Copa América players
Universitario de Sucre footballers
FC Sheriff Tiraspol players
Club Bolívar players
Club Real Potosí players
Club Blooming players
Moldovan Super Liga players
Bolivian Primera División players
Bolivian expatriate footballers
Expatriate footballers in Moldova
Bolivian expatriate sportspeople in Moldova
Afro-Bolivian people